Saint Augusta of Treviso, also known as Augusta of Ceneda, Augusta of Tarvisium, or Augusta of Serravalle, is venerated as a virgin martyr.

Background
Her Acts were written in the 16th century by Minuccio Minucci di Serravalle, who was secretary to Pope Clement VIII and Protonotary apostolic.  According to her legendary Acts, Augusta was the daughter of Matrucus, pagan chief of the Alemanni.   Matrucus had conquered the Friulians, who had been Christianized, and ruled over them.

Augusta converted to Christianity secretly.  Her father had sent spies to watch over her, and one day, when he discovered her praying, he imprisoned her, and then knocked out all of her teeth.  Her enraged father then tortured and decapitated her with his sword at Serravalle, a district of the present-day Vittorio Veneto, around 100 AD.  Some sources state that her death took place in the 5th century.

Veneration
De' Minucci's Acts were included in a volume entitled De probatis sanctorum historiis, a hagiographic study by the 16th century German scholar Laurentius Surius (Lorenz Sauer, Laurence Suhr, Lorenzo Surio), and were published at Cologne.  Her name is listed in Ferrarius’ Catalogue of Saints, but not in the Roman Martyrology. 1 August was the day in which the translation of her relics was celebrated, and 22 August the invention (discovery) of her relics, but the main feast day is 27 March.

Augusta's relics are said to have been found a few years after her death on the hill called Santa Augusta after her, which overlooks Serravalle.  A church dedicated to her was built in the 5th century.

Gallery

References

External links

1st-century Christian martyrs
100 deaths
Converts to Christianity from pagan religions
Year of birth unknown